Sergey Mukhin (born 28 October 1950) is a Soviet equestrian. He competed in two events at the 1972 Summer Olympics.

References

1950 births
Living people
Soviet male equestrians
Olympic equestrians of the Soviet Union
Equestrians at the 1972 Summer Olympics
Sportspeople from Chișinău